Eric Gasana (born May 15, 1986) is a Rwandan footballer who plays as a right-back. He participated at 2012 Africa Cup of Nations with the Rwanda national team.

Career statistics
Scores and results list Rwanda's goal tally first, score column indicates score after each Gasana goal.

References

External links
 

Living people
1986 births
Rwandan footballers
Association football fullbacks
Rwanda international footballers
Footballers from Kinshasa
2011 African Nations Championship players
Rwanda A' international footballers